Rudbārži Parish is an administrative unit of Kuldīga Municipality in the Courland region of Latvia. The parish has a population of 1074 (as of 1/07/2010) and covers an area of 110.42 km2.

Villages of Rudbārži parish 

 Internātskola (Dzirnavas)
 Jaunsieksāte
 Kandeļi
 Kokapuze
 Laukmuiža
 Ļūdikas
 Marijas muiža
 Pansionāts (Grenčukrogs)
 Pelči
 Rudbārži
 Sieksāte (Kalnmuiža)
 Vecsieksāte
 Vidsmuiža
 Zaļumi

Parishes of Latvia
Kuldīga Municipality
Courland